Albert Andersson (29 August 1878 – 19 June 1962) was a Swedish politician. He was a member of the Centre Party.

1878 births
1962 deaths
Centre Party (Sweden) politicians